The 1965 Villanova Wildcats football team represented the Villanova University during the 1965 NCAA University Division football season. The head coach was Alexander F. Bell, coaching his sixth season with the Wildcats. The team played their home games at Villanova Stadium in Villanova, Pennsylvania.

Schedule

References

External links
 Game program: Villanova vs. Washington State at Spokane – October 9, 1965

Villanova
Villanova Wildcats football seasons
Villanova Wildcats football